James O'Brien (born 1983 in Bruree, County Limerick) is an Irish sportsperson. He plays hurling with his local club Bruree and has been a member of the Limerick and Kerry senior inter-county teams at various times since 2003. In 2007 he helped Tralee IT win the Ryan Cup and won a Higher Education All Star the only player outside the Fitzgibbon Cup to do so in 2007. He won a Limerick Senior Hurling Championship medal in 2006 with Bruree.

References

Teams

1983 births
Living people
Bruree hurlers
Limerick inter-county hurlers
Kerry inter-county hurlers